Eclipse chasing is the pursuit of observing solar eclipses when they occur around the Earth. Solar eclipses must occur at least twice and as often as five times a year across the Earth. Total eclipses may occur multiple times every few years.

A person who chases eclipses is known as a umbraphile, meaning shadow lover. Umbraphiles often travel for eclipses and use various tools to help view the sun including solar viewers also known as eclipse glasses, as well as telescopes.

The solar eclipse of March 29, 2006, is an example for an eclipse that many people around the world chased it, when traveling to areas where it was visible as a total eclipse. As of 2017, three New Yorkers, Glenn Schneider, Jay Pasachoff, and John Beattie have each seen 33 total solar eclipses, the current record. Donald Liebenberg, professor of astronomy at Clemson University in South Carolina has seen 26 traveling to Turkey, Zambia, China, the Cook Islands and others.

History

In the 19th century, Mabel Loomis Todd, an American editor and writer, and her husband David Peck Todd, a professor of astronomy at Amherst College, traveled around the world to view solar eclipses. During the solar eclipse of June 30, 1973, Donald Liebenberg and a group of eclipse experts observed the eclipse on board the Concorde and experienced 74 minutes of totality.

See also
 Solar eclipse
 Weather spotting
 Storm chasing

References

Observation hobbies
2010s fads and trends